Ab is a Dutch and English (primarily Canadian) masculine given name. It usually is short form (hypocorism) of Albert and occasionally of Abraham or Abbott. The following people have a full name "Albert(us)", except where noted:

Ab Baars (born 1955), Dutch jazz saxophonist and clarinetist 
Ab van Bemmel (1912–1986), Dutch boxer
Ab Box (1909–2000), Canadian football player
Ab Campbell (1910–1973), Canadian (Toronto) politician
Ab Conway (1914–2001), Canadian middle-distance runner
Ab DeMarco (1916–1989), Canadian ice hockey player
Ab DeMarco, Jr. (born 1949), Canadian ice hockey player
Ab Doderer (born 1926), Dutch chauffeur and kidnapping victim
Ab Douglas (born 1950), Dutch sports sailor
Ab van Egmond (born 1938), Dutch road cyclist
Ab Ekels (born 1950), Dutch sports sailor
Ab Fafié (1941–2012), Dutch footballer
Ab Geldermans (born 1935), Dutch road cyclist
Ab Gowanlock (1900–1988), Canadian curler
 (1949–2008), Dutch footballer
Ab Hardy (1910–?), Canadian speed skater 
Ab Harrewijn (1954–2002), Dutch GreenLeft politician
Ab Heijn (1927–2011), Dutch entrepreneur, chairman of Ahold
Ab Hoffman (born 1947), Canadian track and field athlete Abby Hoffman
Ab Jenkins (1883–1946), American race car driver and  mayor of Salt Lake City (Abbott)
Ab Justice, American golfer
Ab Klink (born 1958), Dutch CDA politician (Abraham)
Ab McDonald (born 1936), Canadian ice hockey player (Alvin Brian)
Ab Newsome (1920–1979), Canadian ice hockey player
Ab Nicholas (1931–2016), American chief executive
Ab Osterhaus (born 1948), Dutch virologist
Ab Rector (1934–2005), Canadian (New Brunswick) politician
Ab Renaud (1920–2012), Canadian ice hockey player
Ab Rogers (1909–?), Canadian ice hockey player
Ab Rosbag (born 1940), Dutch wrestler
Ab Salm (1801–1876), Dutch painter
Ab Saunders (1851–1883), American cowboy and gunman
Ab Sluis (born 1937), Dutch cyclist
Ab Tamboer (1950–2016), Dutch drummer
Ab Tresling (1909–1980), Dutch field hockey player
Ab Walker (1910–2001), Canadian (Ontario) politician
Ab Welsh (1913–1971), Canadian ice hockey player
Ab Wolders (born 1951), Dutch strongman and powerlifter
Ab Wright (1905–1995), American baseball and football player

See also
Bardic names may start with "Ab":
Ab Iolo (1787–1847), Welsh poet and author Taliesin Williams 
Ab Ithel (1811–1862), Welsh antiquary and Anglican priest John Williams 

Dutch masculine given names
English masculine given names
Hypocorisms